Located in Eastern Europe, Moldova is bordered on the west and southwest by Romania and on the north, south, and east by Ukraine. Most of its territory lies in Bessarabia region, between the area's two main rivers, the Nistru and the Prut. The Nistru forms a small part of Moldova's border with Ukraine in the northeast and southeast, but it mainly flows through the eastern part of the country, separating Bessarabia and Transnistria. The Prut River forms Moldova's entire western boundary with Romania.

Basic data

Climate 
Moldova's proximity to the Black Sea gives it a mild and sunny climate.

The heaviest rainfall occurs in early summer and again in October; heavy showers and thunderstorms are common. Because of the irregular terrain, heavy summer rains often cause erosion and river silting.

Weather records:

Chişinău's climate. (Central Moldova)

Bălți's climate. (Northern Moldova)

Tiraspol's climate. (Central Moldova)

Cahul's climate. (Southern Moldova)

Topography 

Most of Moldova's territory is a moderate hilly plateau cut deeply by many streams and rivers. Geologically, Moldova lies primarily on the deep sedimentary rock that gives way to harder crystalline outcroppings only in the north. Moldova's hills are part of the larger Moldavian Plateau.

The eastern slopes of the Dniester Ridge (average , max ), form the high right bank of the Dniester River.

Originally forested, it has been extensively de-forested for agriculture during the 19th and 20th centuries. In contrast to the region to the north and south, which is more slant, this area is referred to as plain, although it has relief very different from that of flatland, and vegetation different from that of the steppe.

Steep forest-clad slopes account for much of the terrain, where the most common trees are hornbeam, oak, linden, maple, wild pear, and wild cherry. The term codri refers more generally to forests, yet since in Moldova most of them were preserved in the central part, Codri sometimes can colloquially refer to the remaining forests in the hills west and north of Chişinău. The Dniester Hills border the Ciulucuri Hills to the north along the river Răut.

The country's highest point, Bălăneşti Hill, which reaches , depending on the source, is situated in the Corneşti Hills, the western part of the Codri Plateau. Northwest of it are the Ciulucului Hills (average , max ). In the south, the Tigheci Hills (average , max ) are a prolongation, and run to the south parallel to the Lower Prut Valley.

To the south-east, the southern part of the Codri Plateau, which averages , max , and has numerous ravines and gullies, gradually merges into the Southern Moldovan Plain, continued by in Ukraine by the Budjak Plain. Most of Gagauzia resides on the Ialpug Plain.

Transnistria (the left bank of the Dniester) has spurs of the Podolian Plateau, (average , max ), which are cut into by tributaries of the Dniester River. The high right bank and low left bank of the Dniester are in sharp contrast here, where visibility is not impeded by forests.

About 75 percent of Moldova is covered by a soil type called black earth or chernozem. In the northern hills, more clay textured soils are found; in the south, red-earth soil is predominant. The soil becomes less fertile toward the south but can still support grape and sunflower production. The hills have woodland soils, while a small portion in southern Moldova is in the steppe zone, although most steppe areas today are cultivated. The lower reaches of the Prut and Dniester rivers and the southern river valleys are saline marshes.

Drainage in Moldova is to the south, toward the Black Sea lowlands, and eventually into the Black Sea, but only eight rivers and creeks extend more than 100 kilometers. Moldova's main river, the Dniester, is navigable throughout almost the entire country, and in warmer winters it does not freeze over. The Prut river is a tributary of the Danube, which it joins at the far southwestern tip of the country. Over 95% of the water circulation in Moldova flows into one of the two rivers - the Prut or Dniester. Of Moldova's well-developed network of about 3,000 creeks and streams, all draining south to the Black Sea, only 246 exceed  in length, and only 8 exceed .

Underground water, extensively used for the country's water supply, includes about 2,200 natural springs. The terrain favors the construction of reservoirs of various sizes.

Extreme points 

 The lowest point: An unnamed point on the bank of the Dniester River 
 The highest point: Dealul Bălăneşti 
 North extreme: Naslavcea
 South extreme: Giurgiuleşti
 West extreme: Criva
 East extreme: Palanca

Natural habitat 

Moldova's natural habitat is characterized by forest steppes, a temperate-climate habitat type composed of grassland interspersed with areas of woodland or forest. A belt of forest steppes cross Eurasia from eastern Europe to Eastern Siberia, forming a transition between temperate broadleaf and mixed forests and temperate grasslands. In the 19th century, Moldova witnessed a sharp decrease in the forested areas, sacrificed for agriculture due to rich soil.

Environment

Historical references

 In the 5th century BC, Herodotus visited the countryside between the rivers Dnister and Prut and described the place as "a plain with deep black earth, rich in grass and well-irrigated".
 Lithuanian Prince Jogaila spoke of Moldavia as "a rich and fructiferous country".
 According to the testimony of Venetian Mateus de Murano, "the country was very well located, reach with cattle and all kinds of fruits, pastures are perfect".
 Rich natural resources of Moldavia always attracted nomads. Fleeing their devastating incursions, inhabitants of Moldavia left the brooded places and hid in forests. French knight Guillebert de Lannoy, who visited these places in 1421, has mentioned an insignificant population of the region: "We moved through large deserts".
 Counsellor of Hungarian King George Reihersdorf (middle of 16th century) was complaining of travel through "empty, uninhabited lands". In 1541, he produced the first geographical map (preserved to this day) of the Principality of Moldavia, with rivers Dnister and Prut shown, as well as cities and other localities, but also highlighted large steppes.
 A map of Moldavia was drawn by the German diplomat Sigismund von Herberstein. On his map one can see woodless spaces - Bălți Steppe in the north, and Bugeac Steppe in the south.
 In the 17th century, pilgrims Pavel Aleppskii (a Syrian deacon) and Ioan Lukianov (a Russian priest) traveled on their way to the Holy land through Moldavia. These two travelers were struck by the disastrous state of the land that used to blossom: "It better be not ravaged, as no other such can be found, it may yield any kind".
 English traveler John Bell, who also visited Moldavia, and wrote about fecund soils and "small nice towns" situated next to Răut.
 Russian geographer K. Laksman described Bălți steppe at the beginning of the 19th century: "To the north is located a steppe with almost no trees at all. To the north-west the steppe is not as woodless".
 Scientist K. Arseniev mentioned that the north of Bessarabia is "a genuine mix of arid steppes with most fertile pastures, rich meadows, and gardens".
 Travelers and scholars were amazed by the contrast between rich natural resources of Moldavia/Bălți steppe and its low population in the war-torn 18th century, the pitiful state of agriculture, as well as the poverty of the local population.
 "Desert, waste, naked steppe... The settling among limitless expanses of Bălți steppe happened not "in accordance" with logic, but "against" it. The life of remote ancestors of Bălțiers was full of difficulties and crosses, but they managed to resist."
 "Moldavian fields, as described by both ancient and contemporary writers, are great in their fertility, by far surpassing the richness of the mountains" (Dimitrie Cantemir, Descriptio Moldaviae)
 "Will someone describes Bessarabian steppes, indeed, they do merit a description. However for this, one needs the talent of unforgettable Gogol, who has so beautifully depicted us the steppes of his homeland. And Bessarabian steppes are not less beautiful." (Constantin Stamati-Ciurea)

Current issues 
Moldova's communist-era environmental legacy, like that of many other former Soviet republics, is one of environmental degradation. Agricultural practices such as overuse of pesticides and artificial fertilizers were intended to increase agricultural output at all costs, without regard for the consequences. As a result, Moldova's soil and groundwater were contaminated by lingering chemicals, some of which (including DDT) have been banned in the West.

Such practices continue in Moldova to the present day. In the early 1990s, use of pesticides in Moldova averaged approximately twenty times that of other former Soviet republics and Western nations. Also, poor farming methods, such as destroying forests to plant vineyards, have contributed to the extensive soil erosion to which the country's rugged topography is already prone.

International environmental agreements 
party to:
Air Pollution, Air Pollution-Persistent Organic Pollutants, Biodiversity, Climate Change, Climate Change-Kyoto Protocol, Desertification, Endangered Species, Hazardous Wastes, Ozone Layer Protection, Ship Pollution, Wetlands

signed, but not ratified: none of the selected agreements

See also 
 Moldova
 List of cities in Moldova

Notes

External links

 Moldova.org
 
 google maps

 

pt:Moldávia#Geografia